Vulcaniella grandiferella is a moth of the family Cosmopterigidae. It is found in Serbia, Macedonia, Greece, Ukraine and southern Russia.

The wingspan is 8–13 mm. There are two generations per year in most of the range, but up to four generations may occur. On the Crimea, adults of the first generation are on wing from mid-May to the beginning of July and adults of the second generation are on wing from July to August.

The larvae feed on Salvia aethiopis and Salvia sclarea. They mine the leaves of their host plant. The mine is irregularly shaped and is mostly located between two main veins near the leaf base. The larva makes several mines, and spends most of its time outside the mine, in a silken tunnel under the leaf. The frass is ejected and accumulates near the entrance of the mine. The larvae prefer lower leaves. Pupation takes place outside of the mine, often on the leaf.

External links
bladmineerders.nl
Fauna Europaea

Vulcaniella
Moths of Europe
Moths described in 1986